Uncial 0244 (in the Gregory-Aland numbering), is a Greek uncial manuscript of the New Testament. Paleographically it has been assigned to the fifth century.

Description 
Currently it is dated by the INTF to the 5th century.

The codex contains a small part of the Acts of the Apostles 11:29-12:5, on 1 parchment leaf (18 cm by 14 cm). It is written in two columns per page, 18 lines per page, in uncial letters.

The manuscript was added to the list of the New Testament manuscripts by Kurt Aland in 1963.

Text 
The Greek text of this codex is a representative of the Alexandrian text-type. Aland placed it in Category II.

Location 
Currently the codex is housed at the Université catholique de Louvain (P. A. M. Khirbet Mird 8) in Louvain-la-Neuve.

See also 

 List of New Testament uncials
 Textual criticism

References

External links 

  – digitized manuscript

Greek New Testament uncials
5th-century biblical manuscripts